is a concrete Arch dam in Sapporo, Hokkaidō; Japan. It dams the Toyohira River. It is situated in Toya National Park.  The dam was created for Irrigation as well as Flood control.  The road leading to the dam has been closed off for regular car use, instead Hybrid electric buses are operated so the natural environment is protected. The dam's lake is known as Jozan Lake (定山湖),

Development 
The construction of the dam began in 1965 and in 1972 the multipurpose dam was completed.

References

Dams in Hokkaido
Minami-ku, Sapporo
Buildings and structures in Sapporo
Dams completed in 1972